Haplogroup C-M217, also known as C2 (and previously as C3), is a Y-chromosome DNA haplogroup. It is the most frequently occurring branch of the wider Haplogroup C (M130). It is found mostly in Central Asia, Eastern Siberia and significant frequencies in parts of East Asia and Southeast Asia including some populations in the Caucasus, Middle East, South Asia, East Europe. It is found in a much more widespread areas with a low frequency of less than 2%.

The haplogroup C-M217 is now found at high frequencies among Central Asian peoples, indigenous Siberians, and some Native peoples of North America. In particular, males belonging to peoples such as the Buryats, Evens, Evenks, Itelmens, Kalmyks, Kazakhs, Koryaks, Mongolians, Negidals, Nivkhs, Udege, and Ulchi have high levels of M217.

One particular haplotype within Haplogroup C2-M217 has received a great deal of attention, because of the possibility that it may represent direct patrilineal descent from Genghis Khan, though that hypothesis is controversial. According to the recent result, C2's subgroups are divided into C2b and C2e, and in Mongolia, most belong to C2b(Genghis Khan modal), while very few are C2e. On the other hand, C2b takes minority and most are C2e in Japan and Korea and Southern East Asia. The specific subclade Haplogroup C3b2b1*-M401(xF5483) of the broader C-M48 subclade, which has been identified as a possible marker of the Manchu Aisin Gioro and has been found in ten different ethnic minorities in northern China, is totally absent from all Han Chinese populations (Heilongjiang, Gansu, Guangdong, Sichuan and Xinjiang).

Y chromosome haplogroup C2c1a1a1-M407 is carried by Mongol descendants of the Northern Yuan ruler from 1474 to 1517, Dayan Khan, who is a male line descendant of Genghis Khan which was found out after geneticists in Mongolia conducted tests on them.
C2b1a3a1c2-F5481 clade of C2*-ST which is also widespread in Central Asia among Kazakhs, Hazaras and ordinary commoner Mongols. The Kerey clan of the Kazakhs have a high amount of the C3* star-cluster (C2*-ST) Y chromosome and is very high among Hazaras, Kazakhs and Mongols in general.

Toghan, Genghis Khan's sixth son has claimed descendants who have Y haplogroup C2b1a1b1-F1756 just like the first son of Genghis Khan, Jochi's descendants in the Kazakh Tore clan.

Origin 
After sharing a most recent common ancestor with Haplogroup C-F3393 approximately 48,400 [95% CI 46,000 <-> 50,900] years before present, Haplogroup C-M217 is believed to have begun spreading approximately 34,000 [95% CI 31,500 <-> 36,700] years before present in eastern or central Asia.

The extremely broad distribution of Haplogroup C-M217 Y-chromosomes, coupled with the fact that the ancestral paragroup C is not found among any of the modern Siberian or North American populations among whom Haplogroup C-M217 predominates, makes the determination of the geographical origin of the defining M217 mutation exceedingly difficult. The presence of Haplogroup C-M217 at a low frequency but relatively high diversity throughout East Asia and parts of Southeast Asia makes that region one likely source. In addition, the C-M217 haplotypes found with high frequency among North Asian populations appear to belong to a different genealogical branch from the C-M217 haplotypes found with low frequency among East and Southeast Asians, which suggests that the marginal presence of C-M217 among modern East and Southeast Asian populations may not be due to recent admixture from Northeast or Central Asia.

More precisely, haplogroup C2-M217 is now divided into two primary subclades: C2a-L1373 (sometimes called the "northern branch" of C2-M217) and C2b-F1067 (sometimes called the "southern branch" of C2-M217).

C2a-L1373 (estimated TMRCA 16,000 [95% CI 14,300 <-> 17,800] ybp) has been found often in populations from Central Asia through North Asia to the Americas, and rarely in individuals from some neighboring regions, such as Europe or East Asia. C2a-L1373 subsumes two subclades: C2a1-F3447 and C2a2-BY63635/MPB374. C2a1-F3447 includes all extant Eurasian members of C2a-L1373, whereas C2a2-BY63635/MPB374 contains extant South American members of C2a-L1373 as well as ancient archaeological specimens from South America and Chertovy Vorota Cave in Primorsky Krai. C2a1-F3447 (estimated TMRCA 16,000 [95% CI 14,700 <-> 17,400] ybp) includes the Y-DNA of an approximately 14,000-year-old specimen from the Ust'-Kyakhta 3 site (located on the right bank of the Selenga River in Buryatia, near the present-day international border with Mongolia) and C2a1b-BY101096/ACT1942 (found in individuals from present-day Liaoning Province of China, South Korea, and a Nivkh from Russia) in addition to the expansive C2a1a-F1699 clade. C2a1a-F1699 (estimated TMRCA 14,000 [95% CI 12,700 <-> 15,300] ybp) subsumes four subclades: C2a1a1-F3918, C2a1a2-M48, C2a1a3-M504, and C2a1a4-M8574. C2a1a1-F3918 subsumes C2a1a1a-P39, which has been found at high frequency in samples of some indigenous North American populations, and C2a1a1b-FGC28881, which is now found with varying (but generally quite low) frequency all over the Eurasian steppe, from Heilongjiang and Jiangsu in the east to Jihočeský kraj, Podlaskie Voivodeship, and Giresun in the west. Haplogroup C2a1a2-M48 is especially frequent and diverse among present-day Tungusic peoples, but branches of it also constitute the most frequently observed Y-DNA haplogroup among present-day Mongols in Mongolia, Alshyns in western Kazakhstan, and Kalmyks in Kalmykia. Extant members of C2a1a3-M504 all share a relatively recent common ancestor (estimated TMRCA 3,900 [95% CI 3,000 <-> 4,800] ybp), and they are found often among Mongols, Manchus (e.g. Aisin Gioro), Kazakhs (most tribes of the Senior Zhuz as well as the Kerei tribe of the Middle Zhuz), Kyrgyz, and Hazaras. C2a1a4-M8574 is sparsely attested and deeply bifurcated into C-Y176542, which has been observed in an individual from Ulsan and an individual from Japan, and C-Y11990. C-Y11990 is likewise quite ancient (estimated TMRCA 6,300 [95% CI 5,100 <-> 7,600] ybp) but rare, with one branch having been found sporadically in Jammu and Kashmir, Germany, and the United States and another branch having been found sporadically in Slovakia (Prešov Region), Turkey, and Kipchak of the central steppe (920 +- 25 BP uncal).

The predominantly East Asian distributed C-F1067 subsumes a major clade, C-F2613, and a minor clade, C-CTS4660. The minor clade C-CTS4660 has been found in China (including a Dai and several Han from southern China as well as a Han from Anhui and a Han from Inner Mongolia) and Thailand (including Northern Thai and Lao Isan). The major clade C-F2613 has known representatives from China (Oroqen, Hezhe, Manchu, Uyghur, Han, Tibetan, Tujia, Dai), Korea, Japan, Laos, Thailand, Vietnam, Bhutan, Bangladesh, Mongolia, Kyrgyzstan (Dungan, Kyrgyz), Tajikistan (Tajik), Afghanistan (Hazara, Tajik), Pakistan (Burusho, Hazara), Nakhchivan, Chechnya, and Syria and includes the populous subclades C-F845, C-CTS2657, and C-Z8440. C-M407, a notable subclade of C-CTS2657, has expanded in a post-Neolithic time frame to include large percentages of modern Buryat, Soyot, and Hamnigan males in Buryatia and Barghut males in Hulunbuir in addition to many Kalmyks and other Mongols and members of the Qongirat tribe in Kazakhstan (but only 2 or 0.67% of a sample of 300 Korean males).

The specific subclade haplogroup C3b2b1*-M401(xF5483) has been identified as a possible marker of the Aisin Gioro and is found in ten different ethnic minorities in northern China, but completely absent from Han Chinese.

Genetic testing also showed that the haplogroup C3b1a3a2-F8951 of the Aisin Gioro family came to southeastern Manchuria after migrating from their place of origin in the Amur river's middle reaches, originating from ancestors related to Daurs in the Transbaikal area. The Tungusic speaking peoples mostly have C3c-M48 as their subclade of C3 which drastically differs from the C3b1a3a2-F8951 haplogroup of the Aisin Gioro which originates from Mongolic speaking populations like the Daur. Jurchen (Manchus) are a Tungusic people. The Mongol Genghis Khan's haplogroup C3b1a3a1-F3796 (C3*-Star Cluster) is a fraternal "brother" branch of C3b1a3a2-F8951 haplogroup of the Aisin Gioro. A genetic test was conducted on seven men who claimed Aisin Gioro descent with three of them showing documented genealogical information of all their ancestors up to Nurhaci. Three of them turned out to share the C3b2b1*-M401(xF5483) haplogroup, out of them, two of them were the ones who provided their documented family trees. The other four tested were unrelated. The Daur Ao clan carries the unique haplogroup subclade C2b1a3a2-F8951, the same haplogroup as Aisin Gioro and both Ao and Aisin Gioro only diverged merely a couple of centuries ago from a shared common ancestor. Other members of the Ao clan carry haplogroups like N1c-M178, C2a1b-F845, C2b1a3a1-F3796 and C2b1a2-M48. People from northeast China, the Daur Ao clan and Aisin Gioro clan are the main carriers of haplogroup C2b1a3a2-F8951. The Mongolic C2*-Star Cluster (C2b1a3a1-F3796) haplogroup is a fraternal branch to Aisin Gioro's C2b1a3a2-F8951 haplogroup.

Distribution 
Haplogroup C-M217 is the modal haplogroup among Mongolians and most indigenous populations of the Russian Far East, such as the Buryats, Northern Tungusic peoples, Nivkhs, Koryaks, and Itelmens. The subclade C-P39 is common among males of the indigenous North American peoples whose languages belong to the Na-Dené phylum. The frequency of Haplogroup C-M217 tends to be negatively correlated with distance from Mongolia and the Russian Far East, but it still comprises more than ten percent of the total Y-chromosome diversity among the Manchus, Koreans, Ainu, and some Turkic peoples of Central Asia. Beyond this range of high-to-moderate frequency, which contains mainly the northeast quadrant of Eurasia and the northwest quadrant of North America, Haplogroup C-M217 continues to be found at low frequencies, and it has even been found as far afield as Northwest Europe, Turkey, Pakistan, Bhutan, Bangladesh, Nepal and adjacent regions of India, Vietnam, Maritime Southeast Asia, and the Wayuu people of South America. It is found in Ossetians 4.7% (1/21), and in Russians 0.73% (3/406),frequency ranges depending on the district.), It's found 0.2% in Central/Southern Russia but 0.9% Rovslav and 0.7% Belgorod. It is found 0.5% in ethnic Bulgarians but 1.2% in Montana Province, 0.8% Sofia Province	and 1.4% in an unknown area some of whom exhibit divergent Y-STR haplotypes. Haplogroup C-M127 also has been found with high frequency in a small sample of Uzbeks from Takhar, Afghanistan (7/13 = 54% C-M217).

In an early study of Japanese Y-chromosomes, haplogroup C-M217 was found relatively frequently among Ainus (2/16=12.5% or 1/4=25%) and among Japanese of the Kyūshū region (8/104=7.7%). However, in other samples of Japanese, the frequency of haplogroup C-M217 was found to be only about one to three percent. In a study published in 2014, large samples of males from seven different Japanese cities were examined, and the frequency of C-M217 varied between a minimum of 5.0% (15/302 university students in Sapporo) and a maximum of 7.8% (8/102 adult males in Fukuoka), with a total of 6.1% (146/2390) of their sampled Japanese males belonging to this haplogroup; the authors noted that no marked geographical gradient was detected in the frequencies of haplogroups C-M217 or C-M8 in that study.

The frequency of Haplogroup C-M217 in samples of Han from various areas has ranged from 0% (0/27) in a sample of Han from Guangxi in southern China to 23.5% (4/17) in a sample of Han from Shanghai in eastern China, 23.5% (8/34) in a sample of Han from Xi'an in northwestern China, and 29.6% (8/27) in a sample of Han from Jilin in northeastern China, with the frequency of this haplogroup in several studies' pools of all Han samples ranging between 6.0% and 12.0%. C-M217 also has been found in many samples of ethnic minority populations from central and southern China, such as Dong (8/27 = 29.6% from Guizhou, 10/45 = 22.2% from Hunan, 1/17 = 5.9% from Guangxi), Bulang (3/11 = 27.3% from Yunnan), Tujia (6/26 = 23.1% from Hubei, 7/33 = 21.2% from Guizhou, 9/49 = 18.4% from Jishou, Hunan), Hani (13/60 = 21.7% from Yunnan, 6/34 = 17.6%), Yi (4/32 = 12.5% Boren from Yunnan, 3/24 = 12.5% Yi from Sichuan, 4/61 = 6.6% Yi from Yunnan), Mulao (1/11 = 9.1% from Guangxi), Naxi (1/12 = 8.3% from Yunnan), Miao (7/92 = 7.6% from Guizhou, 2/58 = 3.4%), Shui (2/29 = 6.9% from Guizhou), She (3/47 = 6.4% from Fujian, 1/34 = 2.9%), Wa (1/16 = 6.3% from Yunnan), Dai (1/18 = 5.6% from Yunnan), Gelao (1/21 = 4.8% from Guizhou), ethnic Vietnamese (2/45 = 4.4% from Guangxi), Yao (1/28 = 3.6% from Guangdong, 1/35 = 2.9% from Liannan, Guangdong, 2/113 = 1.8% from Guangxi), Bai (1/34 = 2.9% from Yunnan), Tibetans (4/156 = 2.6%), Buyi (2/109 = 1.8% from Guizhou), and Taiwanese aborigines (1/48 = 2.1%).

In Vietnam, Y-DNA that belongs to haplogroup C-M217 has been found in about 7.5% of all published samples, including 12.5% (6/48) of a sample of Vietnamese from Hanoi, Vietnam, 11.8% (9/76) of another sample of Kinh ("ethnic Vietnamese") from Hanoi, Vietnam, 10% (1/10) of a sample from Vietnam, 8.5% (5/59) of a sample of Cham people from Binh Thuan, Vietnam, 8.3% (2/24) of another sample of Vietnamese from Hanoi, 4.3% (3/70) of a sample of Vietnamese from an unspecified location in Vietnam, 2.2% (1/46) of the KHV ("Kinh in Ho Chi Minh City, Vietnam") sample of the 1000 Genomes Project, and 0% (0/27) of one study's samples of Kinh and Muong. Macholdt et al. (2020) have found Y-DNA that belongs to haplogroup C-M217 in 4.67% (28/600) of a set of samples from Vietnam, including 26.8% (11/41) of a sample of Hmong from Điện Biên Phủ, 13.9% (5/36) of a sample of Pathen from Quang Bình District, 12.1% (4/33) of a sample of Hanhi from Mường Tè District, 10.3% (3/29) of a sample of Sila from Mường Tè District, and 10.0% (5/50) of a sample of Kinh (n=42 from Hanoi, including all five members of haplogroup C-M217).

Haplogroup C-M217 has been found less frequently in other parts of Southeast Asia and nearby areas, including Myanmar (3/72 = 4.2% Bamar and Rakhine), Laos (1/25 = 4.0% Lao from Luang Prabang), Malaysia (2/18 = 11.1% Malaysia, 0/8 Malaysia, 0/12 Malaysian (ordinary Malay near Kuala Lumpur), 0/17 Orang Asli, 0/27 Malay, 0/32 Malaysia), Java (1/37 = 2.7%, 1/141 = 0.71%), Nepal (2/77 = 2.6% general population of Kathmandu), Thailand (1/40 = 2.5% Thai, mostly sampled in Chiang Mai; 13/500 = 2.6% Northern Thailand, or 11/290 = 3.8% Northern Thai people and 2/91 = 2.2% Tai Lü), the Philippines (1/48 = 2.1%, 1/64 = 1.6%), and Bali (1/641 = 0.2%).

Although C-M217 is generally found with only low frequency (<5%) in Tibet and Nepal, there may be an island of relatively high frequency of this haplogroup in Meghalaya, India. The indigenous tribes of this state of Northeast India, where they comprise the majority of the local population, speak Khasian languages or Tibeto-Burman languages. A study published in 2007 found C-M217(xM93, P39, M86) Y-DNA in 8.5% (6/71) of a sample of Garos, who primarily inhabit the Garo Hills in the western half of Meghalaya, and in 7.6% (27/353) of a pool of samples of eight Khasian tribes from the eastern half of Meghalaya (6/18 = 33.3% Nongtrai from the West Khasi Hills, 10/60 = 16.7% Lyngngam from the West Khasi Hills, 2/29 = 6.9% War-Khasi from the East Khasi Hills, 3/44 = 6.8% Pnar from the Jaintia Hills, 1/19 = 5.3% War-Jaintia from the Jaintia Hills, 3/87 = 3.4% Khynriam from the East Khasi Hills, 2/64 = 3.1% Maram from the West Khasi Hills, and 0/32 Bhoi from Ri-Bhoi District).

Subclade distribution 
The subclades of Haplogroup C-M217 with their defining mutation(s), according to the 2017 ISOGG tree:

C2 (previously C3) M217 Typical of Kazakhs, Mongolians, Buryats, Daurs, Kalmyks, Hazaras, Afghan Uzbeks, Evenks, Evens, Oroqen, Ulchi, Udegey, Manchus, Sibes, Nivkhs, Koryaks, and Itelmens, with a moderate distribution among other Tungusic peoples, Ainus, Koreans, Han, Vietnamese, Altaians, Tuvinians, Uyghurs, Uzbeks, Kyrgyzes, Nogais, and Crimean Tatars. It is found in moderate to low frequencies among Japanese, Tai peoples, North Caucasian peoples, Abazinians, Adygei, Tabassarans, Kabardians, Tajiks, Pashtuns, etc.
C2b L1373, F1396
C2b L1373* Ecuador (Bolívar Province), USA
C2b F3447, F3914
C2b Y163913, ACT1932, BY75034
C2b ACT5638 China (Liaoning), Nivkh
C2b BY72441, Z31698 China (Liaoning), South Korea, Japan
C2b1 F4032
C2b1a F1699, F6301
C2b1a* Japanese, Germany
C2b1a1 F3918, Y10418/FGC28813/F8894
C2b1a1* Yugurs
C2b1a1a P39 Canada, USA (Found in several indigenous peoples of North America, including some Na-Dené-, Algonquian-, or Siouan-speaking populations)
C2b1a1a1 BY1360/Z30568
C2b1a1a2 Z38874
C2b1a1b FGC28881.2
C2b1a1b1 F1756, F3985
C2b1a1b1 F1756* Poland
C2b1a1b1a F3830 China (Kazakh, Yugur, Mongol, Manchu, Hezhen, Xibe, Hui, northern Han), Russian Federation (Altai Kizhi, etc.), Kazakhstan, Afghanistan (Uzbek, Hazara, Pashtun), Saudi Arabia, Syria
C-F3887 Kazakhstan (East Kazakhstan Region), Russia (Tatarstan)
C-F9721 Greece
C-F9721* China (Jiangsu)
C-F12439 China (Heilongjiang)
C-F12439* China (Shandong)
C-BY197432 Kazakhstan
C-Z603 Kazakhstan
C2b1a1b1b Y10420/Z30402, Y10428/Z30415
C-Y10420* Turkey (Giresun)
C-Y11606 United Kingdom
C-Y11606* China (Shaanxi), Russia (Bashkortostan), Poland (Podlaskie), Czech Republic (South Bohemian Region)
C-Y147607 Kazakhstan
C2b1a1b2 B77 Koryak
C2b1a2 (previously C3c) M48
C2b1a2a M77 Typical of Northern Tungusic peoples, Kazakhs, Oirats, Kalmyks, Outer Mongolians, Yukaghirs, Nivkhs, Itelmens, and Udegeys, with a moderate distribution among other Southern Tungusic peoples, Inner Mongolians, Buryats, Tuvinians, Yakuts, Chukchi, Kyrgyz, Uyghurs, Uzbeks, Karakalpaks, and Tajiks
C-M77* China (Xibo), Russian Federation (Ulchi, Even, Evenk, Buryat, Derbet Kalmyks, Torgut Kalmyks), Mongolia (Zakhchin, Derbet), Kazakhstan, TurkeyC2b1a2a1 F11120, SK1061, Z40439
C2b1a2a1a B469
C2b1a2a1a2 B470 Zakhchin, UlchiC2b1a2a1a1 B87 XiboC2b1a2a1a1b B88 BuryatC2b1a2a1a1a B89 Evenk, EvenC2b1a2a1b B80/Z32868 EvensC-B1049 Tozhu TuvanC-F11611/ZQ1
C2b1a2a2 Y12792/F6379
C-Y138418
C-Y152949 Italy (Genova)C-Y138372
C-Y138372* China (Shanxi, Shaanxi, Inner Mongolia)C-Y170702 China (Shaanxi, Heilongjiang, Qinghai)C-Y182574 China (Shaanxi)C-Y12825/SK1064/F5485
C-SK1066, F6193 Russian Federation (Kalmyks), Kazakhstan, Mongolia (Bulgan, Tsaatan)C-Y15849/F12970 Mongolia, Kazakhstan, Russian Federation (Tatarstan)C-Y15844
C-ZQ149 Tomsk TatarC-Y15552 Kazakhstan, Russian Federation, Karakalpak C2b1a2b B90 Found frequently in Koryaks and sporadically among Ulchi, Evenks, Evens, and YukaghirsC2b1a Y4553/FGC16371/F11250
C2b1a3 F1918, M504
C2b1a3a M401 Kazakhs (especially tribes of the Senior Jüz and the Kereys), Hazaras, Mongols, Kyrgyz, Uzbeks, Dungans, Tajiks, Pashtuns, TurkmensC2b1a3a1 Y11121/FGC16431/F12308
C2b1a3a1 BY154208 China (Liaoning, Shandong)C2b1a3a1 F3796, F4002 Kazakhstan, Russian Federation, Hungary, Mongolia, Kyrgyzstan, Ukraine, UzbekistanC-F3796* China (Liaoning)C2b1a3a1a Y4580, F9700
C2b1a3a1a Y4580* China (Heilongjiang)C-Y25681 China (Liaoning)C-Y4633
C-Y4633* Golden Horde (aka Jochi Ulus; 1220 – 1350 cal years CE)C-FGC16336/Y8818/F10216
C-Y8818* China (Liaoning)C-Y80821 BuryatC-Y4541/FGC16328/SK1075/F5481 Mongolia (Derbet), China (Inner Mongolia), Russia (Tatarstan)C-BY182928 UzbekistanC-ZQ31/F10091 Kyrgyzstan (Naryn Region)C-Y4569
C-Y4569* China (Gansu)C-FGC29011 China (Beijing)C-Y125520
C-Y125520* China (Xinjiang)C-Y125522, SK1076 HazarasC-FGC16217 Russia (Ryazan Oblast)C-Y12782
C-Y12782* UkraineC-BY18686 KazakhstanC-Y20795 KazakhstanC-Y20085, Y20086 KazakhstanC2b1a3a1b F3960
C2b1a3a1c SK1072
C-SK1072* KalmykC-Y174643
C-Y174643* China (Shandong)C-F12663 KazakhstanC-ZQ394
C-ZQ394* Russia (Nizhny Novgorod Oblast), UyghurC-FT37001 Russia (Tatarstan, Republic of Crimea)C-Y187693 China (Shandong)C2b1a3a2 F10283 Manchu (Aisin Gioro), Oroqen, Manchurian Evenk, Xibe, Daur, Buryat, MongolC2b1a4 Y11990, F9992/Y12018/Z30601
C2b1a4a Z22425
C2b1a4a Z22425* Jammu and KashmirC2b1a4a1 BY99627 Germany, USAC2b1a4b Z30635 Slovakia (Prešov Region), Kipchak of the central steppe of 920 +- 25 BP uncalC2b1a5 B79 KoryakC2b2 Z31698 Japan C2c C-F1067
C2c1 F2613/Z1338, CTS10762 Germany, PolandC2c1a Z1300, CTS4021
C2c1a CTS4021*
C2c1a1 CTS2657
C2b1a1b-A14895/A14901
C2b1a1b2-Y37069/MF1580 South Korea, North Korea, China (esp. Jilin, Heilongjiang, Liaoning, Ningxia, Gansu, and Hubei)C2b1a1b1-A14909/A14912 China, IrelandC2b1a1b1a-MF1549/MF1553 China (esp. Shandong, Liaoning, Heilongjiang, Tianjin, Jilin, Jiangsu), Taiwan, South Korea (Ulsan)C2b1a1b1b-ACT108/A14908 China (esp. Shanghai, Jiangsu, Anhui, Zhejiang, Liaoning, Shandong), North KoreaC2c1a1 CTS11990, Z18177, F3921
C2c1a1 CTS11990* JapanC2c1a1a CTS8579 Vietnam (Hà Nhì from Mường Tè, Kinh from Gia Lâm)C2c1a1a CTS8579* JapanC2c1a1a F3836, F6346
C2c1a1a1 Y13856
C2c1a1a1 MF1605 China (Guangdong)C-MF1605* Shanxi (Han), Jiangsu, Hunan, Liaoning, Shandong, etc.C-MF1601/S20873 China (Shandong, Zhejiang, Hebei, Liaoning, Beijing, Henan, Anhui, Heilongjiang, Jiangsu, Jilin, Inner Mongolia, Tianjin, etc.), KoreanC-MF1724 China (Beijing, Shandong, Shanghai, Anhui, etc.)C-MF1711 China (Shandong, Anhui, Liaoning, etc.)C-MF1718/MF1721 China (Jiangsu, Beijing, Hebei, Shandong, Shanxi, etc.)C-MF1722
C-MF1745
C-MF187252
C-MF5052
C2c1a1a1 M407 Found with high frequency in some samples of Barghuts, Buryats, Khamnigans, Soyots, and the Qongirat tribe of Kazakhs, moderate frequency in Mongols and Kalmyks, and low frequency in some other Kazakh tribes (Naiman, Alban, Jetyru, Alimuly, Baiuly, Syrgeli, Ysty, Qangly, Jalair), Bai, Cambodian, Evenk, Han, Japanese, Korean, Manchu, Teleut, Tujia, Tuvinian, Uyghur, and Yakut populationsC2c1a1a1* M407 China (esp. Shandong, Hebei, Liaoning, Henan, Beijing, Shaanxi, Inner Mongolia, Jiangsu, Gansu, Heilongjiang, Shanxi), Kazakhstan, Russian FederationC2c1a1a1b Z45401 Armenia, China (Lüliang Han, Dalian Han)C2c1a1a1a F3850
C F29522
C F29522* Gansu (Han), Hubei (Han), Sichuan (Ersu), Shandong (Han)C F8465 China (Hebei, Henan, etc.)C-F10378 China (Inner Mongolia, Beijing, Xinjiang, etc.), Russia (Kalmyk Hoshut)C-F9733/F8536 China (esp. Inner Mongolia), Mongolia (Ulaanbaatar)C-Z4328 Russia (Buryat, Yakut), Kazakhstan (Kazakh from Kostanay Region)C MF3197, SK1027 Northern Han Chinese (HGDP01288), Sichuan (Han), Hubei (Han), Liaoning, ShanghaiC2c1a1a1a3 F7542, F3753
C F7542* Henan (Han)C F26027 Shanghai (Han), Jilin (Han), Sichuan (Han)/Uyghur?C2c1a1a1a4 Y12960, F3916/F13679 China (Shandong, Beijing, Hebei, Henan, Liaoning, Jiangsu, Shaanxi, etc.), Japan (Tokyo) 
C-F3881
C-Y263263 Xinjiang (Uyghur)C-Y312599/BY18318 China (Hubei, Jiangsu, Jilin, Beijing, Qinghai, etc.)C-MF46267 China (esp. Shandong, Liaoning, Jilin, Heilongjiang)C2c1a1a2 CTS4449, CTS8629 China (Beijing, Gansu, Fujian), Korea, Pakistan (Hazaras)C F12768
C F11494 Gansu (Han), Beijing (Han)C FGC54908 Beijing (Han), Zhejiang (Han), Jiangxi (Han), Fujian (Han)C F15754
C F15754* Beijing (Han)C K696
C K696* Heilongjiang (Han)C F2471 Heilongjiang (Han), Shandong (Han), Zhejiang (Han), South KoreaC2b1a1a2-Z31668/BY59164 China (esp. Liaoning, Heilongjiang, Jilin, Jiangsu, Shandong, Tianjin, Hebei)C2c1a1b Y112121, F18822, Z40537 China (Hebei, Jiangsu, Liaoning, etc.), Japan (Nagasaki) 
C2c1a1b MF1792 China (Jiangsu, Yingkou)C2c1a1b MF2816, F20457 China (esp. Jiangsu, Shandong, Hebei, Liaoning)C Y86025 Korea, China (Liaoning, Jilin, Inner Mongolia, Shandong, etc.)C2c1a2 K700/Z12209, F3880
C2c1a2a F1319 Japan, Laos (Laotian in Vientiane), Thailand (Mon, Tai Yuan, Thai, Phutai, Hmong, Lisu), Vietnam (Hmong from Điện Biên Phủ)C2c1a2a1 F3777 Japan, BhutanC-F3777* BangladeshC-F9966
C-F3735 China (Beijing Han, Guangdong)C-Z43727 China (Jiangsu, Shandong, Jilin)C2c1a2a2 F9935, F9765, F10056/Z36838 China, Japan (Saga), NakhchivanC2c1a2a2* China (Jilin)C-MF1955 China (Jiangsu, Shandong, Hebei, Zhejiang, Shaanxi, Anhui, Liaoning, Beijing, Henan, etc.), South KoreaC-MF1960 China (Liaoning Manchus, Shandong, Hebei, Shanxi, Shanghai, Guangdong)C-MF3000 China (Jiangsu, Shandong, Hebei, Henan, Tongliao)C-MF3096 China (Shandong, Beijing, Tianjin, etc.)C2c1a2a2 MF1881 Azerbaijan (Nakhchivan), South KoreaC MF2720 China (Jiangsu, Liaoning, Shandong, etc.)C MF2824 China (Anhui, Shanghai, etc.)C2c1a2a2 MF1029
C-MF1029* China (Zhejiang)C-MF1031
C-MF1031* China (Shanxi)C-MF1037
C-MF1935
C-MF1935* China (Shandong)C-Y174024
C-Y174024* China (Hebei, Jilin)C-Y173881 China (Shandong)C-MF1048
C-Y9412
C-Y9412* China (Liaoning)C-Y172835 China (Hebei)C-MF1055 China (Shandong, Guizhou, Guangdong)C-F2883 ChinaC2c1a2a2 Y35926, F3909 China (Shandong, Sichuan, Jiangxi, Henan, Hebei, Chongqing, Jilin, Liaoning), JapanC-F22689 China (Shandong)C-F3555
C-F3555* China (Shandong)C-F11377
C-F11377* China (Shandong)C-F10356
C-F10356* China (Anhui, Jiangxi)C-MF1892 China (Hunan, Sichuan)C-F13864
C-F13864* China (Henan, Shandong)C-F8841
C-F8841* China (Hebei, Liaoning)C-F13136 China (Jilin, Liaoning, Shandong, Henan, Sichuan, Chongqing, Fujian)C2c1a2b CTS3385, F13857, PH1064 South Korea, Syria, Russia, Germany, Vietnam (Kinh from Gia Lâm, Hoài Đức, and Đan Phượng), Mae Hong Son Province of Thailand (Lisu)C-FGC45553 China (Fujian, Sichuan, Guangdong, Zhejiang, Henan, Shanghai, Hunan)C-PH1906/F15516 China (Mongol from Inner Mongolia, Hinggan League, Liaoning, Tianjin, Hebei, Jiangsu)C2c1a2b2-FGC45548 China (Shandong, Shanxi, Jiangsu, Shaanxi, Anhui, Hubei, Zhejiang, etc.)
C-Z45207 China (Shandong, Hebei, Jiangsu, Beijing, Sichuan, Henan, Liaoning, Shanxi, Guangdong, Anhui, Shaanxi, etc.)
C-MF2000 China (Beijing, Zunyi, Jincheng, Shangrao)
C-MF4453 China (Hebei, Hubei, Shanxi, Zhejiang, Beijing, Shaanxi)
C-MF610668 China (Hebei, Henan, Guangxi Zhuang, Guangdong, Taiwan)
C-PH2194/FGC45566 China (Shanghai, Shandong, Hebei, Beijing, etc.), South Korea
C-Z31672 China (Shandong, Hunan, Henan, Beijing, Shanxi, Hebei, Liaoning, etc.)
C-Z31669 China (Guangdong, Sichuan, Hunan, Guangxi, Hainan, Jilin, Shaanxi), Taiwan
C-F21131/MF142553 China (Jiangsu, Shandong, Henan, Anhui, Shaanxi, Shanxi, Hubei, etc.), Germany
C-FGC45589/FGC45614 China (Shangqiu)
C-FTA20473/MF38210 China (Shanxi, Beijing, Hebei, Zhejiang, Shaanxi, Hunan, etc.), Syria
C-Y37829 China (Guangdong, Hebei, Shandong, Beijing, etc.)
C-Y83760 Russia (Chechen Republic)
C-FGC45610 South Korea (South Jeolla), North Korea, Cambodia (Phnom Penh), China (Shandong)
C2c1a2b-MF1061 China (Zhejiang, Shandong, Jiangsu, Hebei, Henan, Beijing, Shanxi, Guangdong, Shaanxi, Anhui, Sichuan, etc.)
C-S3190/MF37040 China (Jiangsu, Beijing, Nanyang, Sichuan, Longnan, Jinzhou, Tongliao)
C-Y125448/MF2001 China (Henan, Shanxi, Hebei, Shandong, Zhejiang, Beijing, etc.)
C-FGC66275 China (Shanghai, Jiangsu, Hubei, etc.)
C-Y146673 China (Henan, Shandong, Hebei, Beijing, Dandong, Daqing)
C2c1b F845 Found in Han Chinese, Bai, Tujia, Hani, Yi, Lahu, Pathen (Quang Bình), Hmong (Điện Biên Phủ), Iu Mien, Blang, Nyah Kur, Mon, Gelao, Vietnamese (Ho Chi Minh City, Hà Đông), Tai, Buryat, Manchu, Korean, and Japanese populations
C2c1b MF2091 
C MF2091* China (Chongqing Han, Handan, Taiyuan)
C MF2105, MF2106 Vietnam (Pa Then), China (Oroqen, Guangdong), Philippines
C MF2106* Henan (Han), Beijing (Han)
C MF2110 Henan (Han), Beijing (Han)
C2c1b K548
C2c1b K548* Shandong
C2c1b Y17534
C2c1b Y17534* Shandong, Zhejiang
C2c1b F10015 Shanxi, Jiangxi, Ho Chi Minh City (Kinh)
C2c1b1 K511 Xishuangbanna (Dai)
C2c1b1a K516 Thailand (Nyah Kur, Blang, Khon Mueang, Mon, Thai, Lahu)
C2c1b Y170903 Jiangsu
C2c1b Y81530 South Korea (Seoul)
C2c1b2 F5477/SK1036
C2c1b2 F5477/SK1036* Shandong (Han), Zhejiang (Han), Japan (Tokyo)
C2b1b1b4 M93 China (Hebei, Heilongjiang, Shandong, etc.), Japan
C2c1b2 MF5067 Guizhou (Han), Fujian (Han)
C2c1b2 F11898, F10273
C2c1b2 F11898* Guangxi
C-F29519
C-F29519* Sichuan (Yi)
C-F29454 Guizhou (Tujia), Guangdong (Han), Beijing (Han)
C2c1b2b SK1038/MF1015
C2c1b2b* SK1038 Hunan, Heilongjiang (Manchu)
C2c1b2b MF10312 Sichuan, Tujia
C2c1b2b F29490
C-F29490* Jiangsu (Han)
C-F29446 Hunan (Tujia)
C2c1b2b F9683
C-F9683* Fujian (Han)
C-F9819 Hulunbuir (Buryat), Sichuan (Han), Hunan (Tujia)
C2c1b2b1 MF1017
C2c1b2b1a MF1020
C-MF1020* Hunan
C-MF1022
C-MF1022* Sichuan (Han)
C-Y35928/MF1023 Beijing (Han), Hubei (Han), Hunan (Tujia)
C2c1b2b1b Y81534
C-Y81534* Anhui (Han)
C-Y83141 South Korea (Seoul)
C2c1b3 CTS4187
C2c1b4 FGC57604/F29493/F29494
C2c1b4 FGC57604* Yunnan (Bai), Sichuan(Yi), Guangdong (Han), Korea (Chungcheongnamdo)
C2c1b4 F29476 Jilin (Han), Jiangsu (Han), Fujian (Han)
C2c1b4 FGC39587, FGC39579
C2c1b4* FGC39587* Tianjin (Han)
C2c1b4a FGC39603
C2c1b4a FGC39603* Shandong, Jiangsu
C2c1b4a FGC39588 Sichuan
C2c1b4b Y63501 Henan, Hubei
C F19076 Guangdong (Han), Hunan (Han), Shandong (Han)
C Z38903 Sichuan (Han)
C2c1b5 CTS2123/S4350
C2c1b6 Z45272
C2c1b7 MF2040/F18007
C F18007* Zhejiang (Han)
C F29469 Shanxi (Han)
C F20118
C F20118* Heilongjiang (Han)
C F29504 Anhui (Han)
C2c1b8 Z45349
C2c1b9 Z45354
C2c2 CTS4660 China (esp. Hainan, Guangdong, and Guangxi), Thailand
C2c2 CTS4660* Inner Mongolia (Han)
C2c2a F29558
C2c2a1 F9436
C2c2a1a F15270 Guangdong (Han), Yunnan (Dai)
C2c2a1b F29553 Hunan (Han), Jiangxi (Han)
C2c2a2 F10025 Anhui (Han), Fujian (Han)

Others 
P53.1 has been used in multiple studies, but at testing in the commercial labs it appears in too many parts of the Y tree, including multiple parts of haplogroup C. Listed 16 April 2016.

C2-P53.1 Found in about 10% of Xinjiang Sibe and with low frequency in Inner Mongolian Mongol and Evenk, Ningxia Hui, Xizang Tibetan, Xinjiang Uyghur, and Gansu Han

Phylogenetics

Phylogenetic history 

Prior to 2002, there were in academic literature at least seven naming systems for the Y-Chromosome Phylogenetic tree. This led to considerable confusion. In 2002, the major research groups came together and formed the Y-Chromosome Consortium (YCC). They published a joint paper that created a single new tree that all agreed to use. Later, a group of citizen scientists with an interest in population genetics and genetic genealogy formed a working group to create an amateur tree aiming at being above all timely. The table below brings together all of these works at the point of the landmark 2002 YCC Tree. This allows a researcher reviewing older published literature to quickly move between nomenclatures.

Phylogenetic trees

See also

Genetics

Y-DNA C subclades

Y-DNA backbone tree

References

External links 
 C3-M217 FTDNA
 Spread of Haplogroup C-M217, from The Genographic Project, National Geographic

C-M217